The Eliot family  is the American branch of one of several British families to hold this surname. This branch is based in Boston but originated in East Coker, Yeovil, Somerset. It is one of the Boston Brahmins, a bourgeois family whose ancestors had become wealthy and held sway over the American education system. All are the descendants of two men named Andrew Eliot, father and son, who emigrated from East Coker to Beverly, Massachusetts between 1668 and 1670. The elder Andrew (1627 – March 1, 1703/04) served the town and colony in a number of positions and in 1692 was chosen as a juror in the Salem witch trials. His son Andrew (1651 – September 12, 1688) married Mercy Shattuck in 1680 in Beverly and died by drowning after falling off a ship.

The ranks include several College presidents, one Nobel prize winner, and presidents of American professional associations. Charles W. Eliot transformed Harvard from a college to a research institution, a model which many American universities have followed. 

William Greenleaf Eliot co-founded Washington University in St. Louis in 1853, and congressman Thomas H. Eliot was Chancellor of that institution from 1962 to 1971. William Greenleaf Eliot's son Thomas Lamb Eliot went further west and was a seminal figure in the founding of Reed College in Portland, Oregon in 1911. 

The poet T. S. Eliot moved to England and his ashes were interred in East Coker, England. He wanted to be laid to rest in the original birthplace of his first American ancestor and other Eliot ancestors.

Another branch of the American Eliot family descends from Rev. John Eliot of Roxbury, Massachusetts, known as the "Apostle to the Indians". His son, John Eliot, Jr., was the first pastor of the First Church of Christ in Newton. In turn, John Eliot Jr.'s son, Joseph Eliot, became a pastor in Guilford, Connecticut, and later fathered Jared Eliot, a pastor and agricultural writer.

Andrew Eliot's descendants
Well-known descendants of Andrew Eliot include:

Andrew Eliot, prominent Boston Congregational Minister during the Siege of Boston
Charles Eliot, landscape architect and son of Charles William Eliot, uncle of Thomas H. Eliot
Charles Eliot Norton, scholar and man of letters. He was first cousin to Charles William Eliot
Charles William Eliot, President of Harvard University, son of Samuel Atkins Eliot
Rev. Christopher Rhodes Eliot, Unitarian minister and author, son of William Greenleaf Eliot
Clara Eliot, economist at Barnard College, granddaughter of Thomas Lamb Eliot
Edward Cranch Eliot President of the American Bar Association
Frederick May Eliot, President of the American Unitarian Association 1937–1958, son of Christopher Rhodes Eliot
Henry Ware Eliot, businessman and President of the Academy of Science, St. Louis, son of William Greenleaf Eliot
Ida M. Eliot, writer, educator, philosopher, and entomologist, daughter of Thomas Dawes Eliot
John Eliot, co-founder of the Massachusetts Historical Society with Jeremy Belknap, the first such historical society of its kind, and son of Andrew Eliot
Martha May Eliot, a pediatrician and expert in public health; she served as director of the Children’s Bureau’s Division of Child and Maternal Health in the 1920s and 1930s, and is credited with drafting language on women and children in the Social Security Act. Martha May Eliot lived a quiet but public life as a lesbian with her lifelong domestic partner, Ethel Collins Dunham. She was a daughter of Christopher Rhodes Eliot.
Samuel Eliot, Boston banker and merchant, President of Massachusetts Bank, one of the richest man in Boston
Samuel Atkins Eliot, Senator, Mayor of Boston, Treasurer of Harvard University, served in the United States House of Representatives, Massachusetts House of Representatives, and Massachusetts Senate; ; son of Samuel Eliot and father of Charles William Eliot
Samuel Atkins Eliot II, President of the American Unitarian Association 1900–1927, son of Charles William Eliot
Samuel Atkins Eliot, Jr., novelist, son of Samuel Atkins Eliot II
Samuel Eliot, historian, educator, trustee of Massachusetts General Hospital, Museum of Fine Arts (Boston), the American Academy of Arts and Sciences and the Massachusetts Historical Society. He was the cousin of Charles Eliot Norton.
Samuel Eliot Morison, historian, Rear Admiral, United States Naval Reserve, grandson of Samuel Eliot
Thomas Dawes Eliot, U.S. Congressman from Massachusetts, brother of William Greenleaf Eliot
Thomas H. Eliot, Chancellor of Washington University in St. Louis, U.S. Congressman, son of Samuel Atkins Eliot II
Rev. Thomas Lamb Eliot, Regent and Trustee of Reed College, son of William Greenleaf Eliot
Thomas Stearns Eliot (better known as T. S. Eliot), Nobel prize winner, poet, playwright, literary critic and publisher, son of Henry Ware Eliot
Theodore Lyman Eliot I, president of San Francisco Art Institute, grandson of Charles William Eliot, brother of Thomas H. Eliot and Samuel Atkins Eliot Jr, father of Theodore Lyman Eliot II, brother-in-law of Navy Commander Albert Bigelow, the peace activist
Theodore Lyman Eliot II (United States Ambassador to Afghanistan, 1973–1978), nephew of Thomas H. Eliot and Samuel Atkins Eliot Jr, great-grandson of Charles William Eliot, great-great grandson of Samuel Atkins Eliot; Charles Eliot, the landscape architect, was his great-uncle
William Greenleaf Eliot, co-founder and third Chancellor of Washington University in St. Louis
Andrew Eliot Rice, a founder of Peace Corps, grandson of Samuel Atkins Eliot II
Edward Samuel Ritchie, inventor and physicist, great-grandson of Andrew Eliot, the Boston minister
Joan R. Rosenblatt (née Joan Eliot Raup), statistician at the National Institute of Standards and Technology, daughter of Clara Eliot

References
The Family of William Greenleaf Eliot and Abby Adams Eliot of St. Louis, Missouri: 1811-1931 by Henry Ware Eliot, Jr. (c. 1931)
The Family of William Greenleaf Eliot and Abby Adams Eliot, as Chronicled by their Descendants, to 1988 by Henry Eliot Scott (1988)
 Asticou Foreside, genealogy written by Charles W. Eliot II, 1981
The Genealogy of the Somerset branch of the American Eliot Family
Cynthia Grant Tucker, No Silent Witness: The Eliot Parsonage Women and their Unitarian World, Oxford University Press, 2010, 344 pp.
A Sketch of the Eliot Family by Walter Graeme Eliot, Press of Livingston Middleditch, New York, 1887 Online at the Library of Congress

Citations

 
American families of English ancestry